Mahmoud Abbas (born 1935) is a Palestinian politician.

Mahmoud Abbas may also refer to:
 Mahmoud Abbas (cyclist) (born 1978), Egyptian cyclist who competed at the 2000 Summer Olympics
 Mahmoud Abbas (footballer) (born 1988), Arab-Israeli footballer

See also
 Muhammad Abbas (disambiguation)